Nu Riot (printed as NU ЯIOT and pronounced "New Riot") is the debut "mini-album" from Wagdug Futuristic Unity, released on October 24, 2007. Ill Machine was the only single from the album and also appears on the soundtrack for the new Appleseed Ex Machina. Also, The  intro of the remixed version of Hakai (Deathtroy) is sampled from the SPK song "slogun".

Track listing
"Nu Riot" (featuring Shitdisco) – 2:55
"Mad Saturator"  – 1:47
"Ill Machine" (featuring Ultra Brain) (album version) – 5:14
"Budda Space" – 0:53
"Mass Compression" (featuring Ultra Brain) - 1:29
"Imgn x Loud" (featuring Motor) – 4:57
"Hakai (Deathtroy)" (featuring DJ Starscream) (Mix by Cycheouts G) – 4:30

Personnel
Hiroshi Kyono - vocals, lyrics, synth

Guest appearances
Shitdisco
Ultra Brain
Motor
DJ Starscream
Cycheouts G

References

External links
 Official Wagdug Futuristic Unity Website

Hiroshi Kyono albums
2007 EPs